Events from the year 1857 in Scotland.

Incumbents

Law officers 
 Lord Advocate – James Moncreiff
 Solicitor General for Scotland – Edward Maitland

Judiciary 
 Lord President of the Court of Session and Lord Justice General – Lord Colonsay
 Lord Justice Clerk – Lord Glencorse

Events 
 18 March – the Greenock Telegraph begins publication.
 1 May – Institution of Engineers and Shipbuilders in Scotland inaugurated in Glasgow.
 30 June – 9 July: trial of Madeleine Smith, charged with the poisoning of a former lover in Glasgow; a "not proven" verdict is returned.
 9 November – The Western Bank of Scotland (Glasgow) collapses.
 16 November – the 93rd (Sutherland Highlanders) Regiment of Foot wins six Victoria Crosses in the storming of Sikandar Bagh during the second relief of Lucknow in the Indian Rebellion of 1857.
 Police (Scotland) Act 1857 makes the provision of a police force mandatory in the counties of Scotland.
 Lunga, Treshnish Isles, is depopulated.
 First whaler to be fitted with a steam engine, the Tay at Dundee.
 W. C. Stewart publishes The Practical Angler.

Births 
 31 March – John James Burnet, architect (died 1938)
 11 April – John Davidson, poet and playwright (drowned himself 1909 at Penzance)
 15 May – Williamina Fleming, née Stevens, astronomer noted for her discovery of the Horsehead Nebula in 1888 (died 1911 in the United States)
 15 June – William Fife, yacht designer (died 1944)
 4 July – John Campbell, architect (died 1942 in New Zealand)
 11 July – David Prain, botanist (died 1944)
 19 September – James Bridie, international rugby union player (died 1893 in England)
 2 October – John Macintyre, laryngologist and pioneer radiographer (died 1928)
Date unknown – John Wilson, Lord Ashmore, Sheriff 1900–20, Senator of the College of Justice 1930–28 (died 1932)

Deaths 
 9 March – James Duff, 4th Earl Fife, general in Spanish service and landowner (born 1776)
 19 March – William Henry Playfair, architect (born 1790 in London)
 15 April – William Skinner, bishop and Primus (born 1778)
 26 August – Christian Isobel Johnstone, writer and editor (born 1781)
 14 October – Alexander Laing, "the Brechin poet" (born 1787)
 18 November – John Fleming, minister, naturalist, zoologist and geologist (born 1785)

The arts
Britannia Music Hall opened in Glasgow.

See also 
 Timeline of Scottish history
 1857 in the United Kingdom

References 

 
Years of the 19th century in Scotland
Scotland
1850s in Scotland